Gerhard Thyben (24 February 1922 – 4 September 2006) was a German Luftwaffe fighter ace and recipient of the Knight's Cross of the Iron Cross with Oak Leaves during World War II. A flying ace or fighter ace is a military aviator credited with shooting down five or more enemy aircraft during aerial combat.

Thyben flew 385 combat missions and claimed 157 aerial victories. He claimed 152 victories on the Eastern Front, including 28 Il-2 Sturmoviks and five victories on the Western Front. He flew 22 fighter-bomber missions on which he claimed two aircraft and seven trucks destroyed on the ground.

Early life and career
Thyben was born on 24 February 1922 in Kiel, at the time the capital of the Province of Schleswig-Holstein, a free State of Prussia in the Weimar Republic. Following graduation from school, he volunteered for military service in the Luftwaffe on 15 July 1940. He completed his recruit training with Fliegerausbildungs-Regiment 43 (43rd Aviators Training Regiment) in Wien-Stammersdorf and was then transferred to 3./Fliegerausbildungs-Regiment 32 (3rd company of the 32nd Aviators Training Regiment) in Rochefort-en-Terre for flight training on 14 October. On 15 November he was transferred to another flight school where he was promoted to Gefreiter (Privat First Class) on 1 July 1941.

On 16 September 1941, Thyben was posted to the Jagdfliegervorschule 2 (2nd fighter pilot pre-school), passing this course on 14 December. He was then transferred to the Jagdfliegerschule 5 (5th fighter pilot school) in Wien-Schwechat. There, for disciplinary reasons, he was arrested for six days in April and further five days in May 1942. After he completed his fighter pilot training on 1 November, Thyben was then posted to the 3. Staffel (3rd squadron) of Ergänzungs-Jagdgruppe Ost, a specialized training unit for new fighter pilots destined for the Eastern Front, and on 13 November to 1. Staffel of Ergänzungs-Jagdgruppe Süd. On 13 December 1942, Thyben was posted to the II. Gruppe (2nd group) of  Jagdgeschwader 3 "Udet" (JG 3—3rd Fighter Wing), named after the World War I fighter ace Ernst Udet. This Gruppe was then based on the southern sector of the Eastern Front and Thyben was assigned to 6. Staffel.

World War II
On 30 September 1944, Thyben was credited with his 100th aerial victory. He was the 93rd Luftwaffe pilot to achieve the century mark.

On 8 May 1945 he claimed his last victory over the Baltic Sea. He shot down a Petlyakov Pe-2 that was almost certainly looking for German refugee ships escaping from the besieged Courland Pocket. Thyben caught the reconnaissance Pe-2 at 07:54 and achieved what very well might have been the last Focke-Wulf Fw 190 victory of World War II. The Pe-2 crew, consisting of Starshiy Leytenant Grigoriy Davidenko, Kapitan Aleksey Grachev, and Starshina Mikhail Murashko were all killed in the engagement. Thyben surrendered to the British on touching down. Following his release in 1946 he traveled to Spain and Argentina before serving as an instructor with the Colombian Air Force.

Summary of career

Aerial victory claims
According to US historian David T. Zabecki, Thyben was credited with 157 aerial victories. Mathews and Foreman, authors of Luftwaffe Aces — Biographies and Victory Claims, researched the German Federal Archives and state that Thyben was credited with 157 aerial victories. This figure includes 152 aerial victories on the Eastern Front and 5 over the Western Allies.

Victory claims were logged to a map-reference (PQ = Planquadrat), for example "PQ 34 Ost 79142". These sectors were then subdivided into 36 smaller units to give a location area 3 × 4 km in size.

Awards
 Iron Cross (1939)
 2nd Class (25 May 1943)
 1st Class (10 July 1943)
 Honour Goblet of the Luftwaffe on 6 September 1943 as Unteroffizier and pilot
 German Cross in Gold on 24 October 1943 as Feldwebel in the 6./Jagdgeschwader 3
 Knight's Cross of the Iron Cross with Oak Leaves
 Knight's Cross on 6 December 1944 as Oberleutnant and Staffelkapitän of the 7./Jagdgeschwader 54
 822nd Oak Leaves on 8 April 1945 as Oberleutnant and Staffelkapitän of the 7./Jagdgeschwader 54

Notes

References

Citations

Bibliography

 
 
 
 
 
 
 
 
 
 
 
 
 
 
 
 
 

1922 births
2006 deaths
Military personnel from Kiel
German World War II flying aces
Recipients of the Gold German Cross
Recipients of the Knight's Cross of the Iron Cross with Oak Leaves
People from the Province of Schleswig-Holstein
Colombian military personnel